The Curry Mile is a nickname for the part of Wilmslow Road running through the centre of  Rusholme in south Manchester, England. The name is earned from the large number of restaurants, takeaways and kebab houses specialising in the cuisines of South Asia and the Middle East, thought to be the largest concentration of South Asian restaurants in United Kingdom. The Curry Mile is notable for its streets being busy into the early hours of the morning. The area is frequently visited by local students, because of its location near the Oxford Road and Fallowfield Campuses of the University of Manchester, Xaverian College and the Oxford Road/All Saints campus of the Manchester Metropolitan University.

On film
In May 1995, Aneel Ahmed and Faisal A. Qureshi wrote Movin As A Massive, a Channel 4 documentary written for the Lloyds Bank Film Challenge, of which it was the winning entry. It also won the 1996 "Race in the Media Award" for Best Youth Programme, and was nominated by the Royal Television Society in 1996 for "Most Innovative Film/Video".

It was directed by Ninder Billing, and produced by Andy Porter and Madeline French for Compulsive Viewing. A semi sequel, Wimmy Road, was later written for BBC Radio Drama by Qureshi and directed by Nadia Molinari. It was nominated for a "Race in the Media Award" for Best Radio Drama. The Curry Mile was the main filming location for the episode Serving the Community (1997) from the television series Hetty Wainthropp Investigates.

In books
The Curry Mile, a novel written by Zahid Hussain, is set in the contemporary Curry Mile, and features characters involved in the restaurant trade.

See also
 Curry Row – a stretch of South Asian restaurants in Lower Manhattan, New York City

References

See also
 List of restaurant districts and streets

Restaurant districts and streets in England
British cuisine
Indian restaurants in the United Kingdom
Pakistani cuisine in the United Kingdom
Tourist attractions in Manchester
Culture in Manchester
Little Pakistans